Heaven Lake (Korean: , Ch'ŏnji or Cheonji; , Tiānchí; Manchu:  Tamun omo or  Tamun juce) is a crater lake on the border between China and North Korea. It lies within a caldera atop the volcanic Paektu Mountain, a part of the Baekdudaegan and Changbai mountain ranges. Heaven Lake has been recognized as the highest volcanic lake in the world by the Shanghai Office of the Guinness Book of Records.

Geology and limnology

The caldera which contains Heaven Lake was created by the 946 eruption of Paektu Mountain.
From mid-October to mid-June, it is typically covered with ice.

History

Names and legends

North Korean propaganda claims that Kim Jong-il was born near the lake on the mountain. In accordance with this, North Korean news agencies reported that on his death, the ice on the lake cracked "so loud, it seemed to shake the heavens and the Earth".

Notable visits
As part of an Inter-Korean summit, heads of states Kim Jong-un and Moon Jae-in visited Mount Paektu and Heaven Lake on September 20, 2018. Moon filled a bottle with water from the lake to take back to South Korea. The visit to the lake was a symbolic gesture, as both the lake and the mountain have considerable cultural significance to the Korean people. Mount Paektu is mentioned in the anthems of both North and South Korea, and is considered to be the spiritual home of the Koreans.

Lake Tianchi Monster

Heaven Lake is also alleged to be home to the Lake Tianchi Monster.

On September 6, 2007, Zhuo Yongsheng (director of a TV station's news center run by the administration office of the nature reserve at Mount Changbaishan, Jilin) shot a 20-minute video of six seal-like, finned "Lake Tianchi Monsters", near the North Korean border. He sent pictures of the Loch Ness Monster-type creatures to Xinhua's Jilin provincial bureau. One of them showed the creatures swimming in three pairs, in parallel. Another showed them together, leaving ripples on the volcanic lake.

In popular culture 
The lake is the subject of the song "Tianchi Lake" on The Mountain Goats' 2008 album Heretic Pride.

See also

Korean Peninsula
Baekdudaegan
Tourism in North Korea

References

Notes

Lakes of China
Calderas of Asia
Volcanic crater lakes
Bodies of water of Jilin
China–North Korea border
International lakes of Asia
Lakes of North Korea